RND may refer to:

 National Rally for Democracy (disambiguation)
 RedaktionsNetzwerk Deutschland, a large newspaper chain in Germany
 Red Nose Day, see Comic Relief
 Reflex neurovascular dystrophy
 Research and development (R&D), especially in domain names as "&" is not a permitted character
 Resistance-nodulation-cell division superfamily
 Rostov-on-Don Airport, air traffic control
 Royal Naval Division

See also
 Rnd (disambiguation)